Sandman is the twelfth studio album by American singer-songwriter Harry Nilsson, released in January 1976 on RCA Victor.

Track listing
All music and lyrics by Harry Nilsson, except where noted.

"I'll Take a Tango" (Alex Harvey) – 2:58
"Something True" (Nilsson, Perry Botkin, Jr.) – 2:54
"Pretty Soon There'll Be Nothing Left for Everybody" – 2:50
"The Ivy Covered Walls" – 3:15
"Here's Why I Did Not Go to Work Today" (Nilsson, Danny Kortchmar) – 4:05
"The Flying Saucer Song" – 6:40
"How to Write a Song" – 3:12
"Jesus Christ You're Tall" – 4:08
"Will She Miss Me" – 4:43

Personnel
Harry Nilsson – vocals
Joe Cocker – vocals on "The Flying Saucer Song"
Doug Dillard – banjo
Klaus Voormann – bass
Jim Keltner – drums
Danny Kortchmar, Fred Tackett, Jesse Ed Davis – guitar
Jane Getz, Leon Russell, Van Dyke Parks – keyboards
Emil Richards, Emmett Kennedy, Gary Coleman, Joe DeAguero, Pat Murphy, Robert Greenidge – percussion
Bobby Keys, Gene Cipriano, Jay Migliori, Jim Horn, John Rotella, Trevor Lawrence – saxophone
Bobby Bruce, Ilene Novog, The Perry Botkin, Jr. Orchestra and Singers – strings
Production and technical personnel
Perry Botkin Jr. – arrangements on "Something True", "The Ivy Covered Walls" and "Will She Miss Me"
Richie Schmitt – recording engineer, associate producer
Pete Abbott, Artie Torgersen, Mike Moran – second engineers 
Gribbitt – design and graphics
Klaus Voormann – inside artwork
Mal "The Pal" Evans – cover photography
Marge Meoli – A&R coordination

Charts

The Flying Saucer Song 
Many people think they recognize one of the main voices in Harry Nilsson's "The Flying Saucer Song" as Joe Cocker. But the voices are all Nilsson using three distinct voice inflections. The gruff background vocals, however, are provided by Joe Cocker, whose coarse delivery is similar to Nilsson's.

"I don't think there's that much of a similarity," Nilsson remarked, "It's just that we both can occasionally muster up a brandy tone. We're whiskey-throated tenors. The Orson Welles type of guy from Citizen Kane."

"The Flying Saucer Song" was written for, and originally recorded, during the Pussy Cats sessions but was not released until Sandman.

References

Harry Nilsson albums
1976 albums
Albums arranged by Perry Botkin Jr.
RCA Records albums